Joseph Charles Regan (July 12, 1872 – November 18, 1948) was an outfielder in Major League Baseball. He played for the New York Giants in 1898.

References

External links

1872 births
1948 deaths
Major League Baseball outfielders
New York Giants (NL) players
Baseball players from Connecticut
19th-century baseball players